Ja'Tovia Gary is an American artist and filmmaker based in Brooklyn, New York. Her work is held in the permanent collections at the Whitney Museum, Studio Museum of Harlem, and others. She is best known for her documentary film The Giverny Document (2019), which received awards including the Moving Ahead Award at the Locarno Film Festival, the Juror Award at the Ann Arbor Film Festival, Best Experimental Film at the Blackstar Film Festival, and the Douglas Edwards Experimental Film Award from the Los Angeles Film Critics Association.

Early life and education 
Gary was born in Dallas, Texas and raised in the nearby suburb of Cedar Hill, in a Pentecostal church community. As a student she was active in local theatre programs and went on to receive her diploma from Booker T. Washington High School for the Performing and Visual Arts.

Gary pursued a professional career in acting but she soon became disheartened by the reductive roles and characters that she was offered. She then enrolled at Brooklyn College and completed a dual bachelor of art degree in Documentary Film Production and Africana Studies.

She later received her MFA in Social Documentary Filmmaking at the School of Visual Arts. She also holds a Documentary Filmmaking Certificate from the LV Prasad Academy in Chennai, India.

Career

Filmmaking 
Gary's work has focused on themes such as black feminist subjectivity and has confronted the history of these subjects by featuring archival footage in her work. Her 2015 short film An Ecstatic Experience combined clips of actress Ruby Dee with an interview of Assata Shakur, using a technique she called "direct animation."

In 2016, Gary participated in the Terra Summer Residency program, in Giverny, France. During that time, she produced her short film Giverny I (Négresse Impériale), which combined video clips of herself with the footage filmed by Philando Castile's girlfriend shortly after he was shot by a police officer. The film is also included in her 2019 documentary The Giverny Document that explores what it means to live life as a Black woman. The film received critical acclaim and garnered awards from festivals including the Blackstar Film Festival and Locarno International Film Festival.

In conversation with Michael B. Gillespie, a film theorist and historian at the Lewis Center for the Arts at Princeton University, Gary described her process: "I am simultaneously creating and destroying, remaking and unmaking. My intimate interaction with the archive... expresses my desire to be a part of it, to make my presence felt in and on that history while also interrogating it." Gillespie noted that "Gary renders film blackness as cinema in the wake, an assemblage of work that poses new circuits and aesthetic accountings of blackness, sociality, and obliteration."

Gary worked as a post-production and archival assistant for Spike Lee's Bad 25 and Shola Lynch's Free Angela and All Political Prisoners, as well as assistant editor on Jackie Robinson, a two-part biographical documentary directed by Ken Burns, Sarah Burns, and David McMahon, which premiered April 2016 on PBS.

Her work has received financial support including the Creative Capital award, support from the DOC Society, the Jerome Foundation, Rooftop Films, the Free History Project, BritDOC, and the Sundance Institute. In 2022 she received a Guggenheim Foundation Fellowship.

Other work 
In 2008, Gary appeared in Grand Theft Auto IV as Cherise Glover, the random encounters character.

In June 2013, Gary was among the founding members of the New Negress Film Society, a collective of black women filmmakers that seeks to create a community and raise awareness of black female voices and stories in the film industry.

She has taught at The New School and Mono No Aware in New York City.

Gary was a 2018–2019 Radcliffe-Harvard Film Study Center fellow at Harvard University. She is represented by Paula Cooper Gallery in New York, and by Galerie Frank Elbaz in Paris.

Exhibitions 
Gary's work has screened at venues such as the Ann Arbor Film Festival, the Edinburgh International Film Festival, Frameline, the New Orleans Film Festival, Gdansk Animation Festival, BlackStar Film Festival, and Tampere Film Festival. Gary's work has been exhibited at cultural institutions  including the Brooklyn Museum, The Kitchen in New York City, the Hammer Museum in Los Angeles, the Institute of Contemporary Art, Philadelphia, MoMA PS1, the Museum of Contemporary Art, Los Angeles, and the Museum of Modern Art.

In 2020, Los Angeles's Hammer Museum and the Paula Cooper Gallery in New York presented Gary's experimental film The Giverny Document.

Permanent collections
Gary's work is held in the permanent collections of the Whitney Museum of American Art, Art, Design & Architecture Museum of UC Santa Barbara, Studio Museum of Harlem, the Thoma Foundation, and the Memorial Art Gallery.  On February 26, 2018, the Whitney released a video by artist Shellyne Rodriguez where she responds and discusses Gary's film An Ecstatic Experience.

Accolades 
 2017 - 25 New Faces of Independent Filmmaking, Filmmaker Magazine
 2018 - Radcliffe Institute Fellow, Harvard University
 2019 - Field of Vision Fellowship
 2019 - Creative Capital award
 2022 - Guggenheim Fellowship

Filmography

Documentaries

Music videos

Other work

Awards and nominations

See also 
 Black Women Filmmakers

References

External links
 
 
 New Negress Film Society

Living people
American multimedia artists
1984 births
American video artists
New media artists
American women artists
People from Dallas
American filmmakers
African-American women artists
African-American artists
Brooklyn College alumni
21st-century African-American people
21st-century African-American women
20th-century African-American people
20th-century African-American women